Klodeta Gijni (Tirana, 20 August 1964) is a former Albanian high jumper. She is the current national outdoor record holder (1.92 m). It was the only female member of the Albanian team at the first edition of the World Athletics Championships in Helsinki (Finland) from 7 to 14 August 1983.

Biography

She began her sporting activity in the special sports classes at the "20 Vjetori i çlirimit" school and soon realized that high jump was her future in athletics: in that regards, during her sports career for ten years in a row she was national champion  (from 1980 to 1990). She made also progress in national records and on August 21, 1989 in Tirana, she passed the bar placed at m. 1.92, an achievement that up to today is the Albanian national record. During her sports militancy she also achieved good results in pentathlon and heptathlon. Member of the Albanian athletics team, from 1980 to 1991 she participated in international activities also climbing on the podium, and was the only female athlete representing the colors of his country at the first World Athletics Championship in Helsinki, Finland, from 7 to 14 August 1983. From 1973 to 1992 she was member of the sports club "17 Nëntori", the representative team of the city of Tirana, and after her transfer to Italy in the 1992-93 season was member of Assi Banca Toscana team.

Studies

Klodeta Gijni graduated at the University of Tirana in Business Economics, (1982-1986) and achieved the ISEF Diploma in the years 1988-1992.  Later she moved to Italy when she achieved a short degree at the University of Bologna in 2006 in Physical Education and Sport Sciences and in 2008 she completed the specialized degree course in Adapted Preventive Gymnastics. In 2017 she added another degree in Marketing Management, always at the Bologna University. Nowadays she is professor of   Physical Education and Sport Science in a Bologna High School and she still holds her passion for athletics as a master athlete of the Felsinean team "Acquadela". She is "Grand Master" of the Albanian Republic and "Emeritus Master of Sport" and honorary citizen of the Përmet municipality.
She also keeps and runs a blog where she discusses topics about sports, wellness and marketing.

International competitions

References

1964 births
Living people
Sportspeople from Tirana
Albanian high jumpers
Albanian female athletes
Female high jumpers
World Athletics Championships athletes for Albania
Albanian emigrants to Italy
Athletes (track and field) at the 1991 Mediterranean Games
Mediterranean Games competitors for Albania